John Carroll Gallagher (February 18, 1892 – March 30, 1952) was a Major League Baseball second baseman who played for the Baltimore Terrapins of the Federal League in .

External links

1892 births
1952 deaths
Major League Baseball second basemen
Baltimore Terrapins players
Baseball players from Pennsylvania